Külmale maale is an album released in 1989 by an Estonian punk rock band J.M.K.E.

It consists of songs written by Villu Tamme in the 1980s. It was first released as an LP in 1989 and as a CD in 1993. The album is considered by music critics to be the best Estonian music album ever made.

Track listing
 "Valge liblika suvi"
 "Tere perestroika"
 "Mu vanaisa oli desertöör"
 "Tsensor"
 "Käed üles, Virumaa!"
 "Elab veel Beria"
 "Internatsid"
 "Külmale maale"
 "Tbilisi tänavad"
 "Nad ei tea mu nime"
 "Meid aitab psühhiaatria"
 "Lõputu laupäev"

CD bonus tracks 
 "Pieni mies, iso tuoppi"
 "Magamistoa aknast paistab keemiakombinaat"
 "Lahendus on kaos"
 "Tere perestroika I"
 "Tere perestroika II"
 "Sõjavägi kohustab" (demo)
 "Lahendus on kaos II" (demo)

Personnel
Vocals and guitar - Villu Tamme
Bass - Lembit Krull
Drums - Venno Vanamölder
Producing - Stupido Twins

References 

1989 albums
Estonian-language albums
J.M.K.E. albums